The 1923 college football season saw several teams finish their seasons unbeaten and untied. As such, numerous schools claim a national championship for the 1923 season. Illinois (coached by Bob Zuppke) and Michigan (coached by Fielding "Hurry-Up" Yost), both members of what is now the Big Ten Conference, finished with records of 8–0 and were selected as national champion by multiple selectors. Illinois featured break-out star Red Grange. Ivy League teams Yale and Cornell also had undefeated seasons. Cornell was selected as national champion by one selector.

Southern Methodist University (SMU) had a record of 9–0, thanks to coach Ray Morrison bringing the forward pass to the southwest.  Teams that had no defeats, but had been tied, were California (9–0–1), Texas (8–0–1), and Kansas (5–0–3).

In the 1924 Rose Bowl, Washington tied Navy 14–14.

Conference and program changes

Conference establishments
The Iowa Intercollegiate Athletic Conference, now a Division III conference, began football play in 1923.

Conference membership changes

Program changes
 University of Washington Sun Dodgers officially changed their nickname to their present moniker, the Huskies.

September

September 29 
Notre Dame opened its season with a 74–0 win over visiting Kalamazoo College.
After a warmup game against a team of Cal alumni, California beat St. Mary's 49–0.
Cornell beat St. Bonaventure 41–6, Dartmouth beat Norwich 13–0, and Syracuse beat Hobart 33–0.

October
October 6  
Illinois beat Nebraska 24–7 and Michigan defeated Case 36–0.  Syracuse beat William & Mary 61–3.  Notre Dame beat Lombard College 14–0. Kansas defeated Creighton 6–0.  California defeated Santa Clara 48–0.  Following wins over the crews of USS Mississippi (33–0) and USS New York (42–7), Washington beat Willamette 54–0. Vanderbilt beat Howard 27–0. Dartmouth beat Maine 6–0. Yale beat North Carolina 53–0, and Cornell beat Susquehanna 84–0.

October 13 
Notre Dame beat Army 13–0
Dartmouth beat Boston University 24–0, and Yale beat Georgia 40–0.  Michigan beat Vanderbilt 3–0, and Illinois beat Butler 21–7 
California beat the Olympic Club 16–0 and Washington beat Whitman College 19–0.  Kansas beat Oklahoma State 9–0.

October 20 
Cornell beat Williams 28–6, Yale beat Bucknell 29–14 and Dartmouth beat Vermont 27–2.  Notre Dame won at Princeton 25–2.  Illinois won at Iowa 9–6 and Michigan beat Ohio State 23–0. Texas beat Vanderbilt 16–0. At Lincoln, Kansas and Nebraska played to a 0–0 tie. California beat Oregon State 26–0 and Washington beat visiting USC 22–0.

October 27 
Cornell defeated Colgate 34–7.
Yale beat Brown 21–0 and Dartmouth beat Harvard 16–0
Notre Dame beat Georgia Tech 35–7.  In Chicago, Illinois beat Northwestern 29–0.  Michigan beat Michigan State 37–0.  Kansas and Kansas State played to a scoreless tie (0–0).
At Portland, Oregon, California continued its streak of shutouts with a 9–0 win over Washington State.  Washington beat Puget Sound 24–0. Vanderbilt defeated Tulane 17–0.

November
November 3 
Yale beat Army 31–10
Notre Dame beat Purdue 34–7
Dartmouth (5–0–0) hosted Cornell (4–0–0) and in a triumph of Big Red over Big Green, Cornell won 32–7.

Illinois and Chicago, both unbeaten (4–0–0) met at Champaign, with the Illini winning 7–0.  Michigan won at Iowa 9–3.
Kansas won at Oklahoma 7–3.
California held visiting Nevada scoreless for its seventh straight shutout, but could not score either, suffering a 0–0 tie.  Washington stayed unbeaten and untied with a 14–0 win at Oregon State. Mississippi A&M tied Vanderbilt in the rain, 0–0.

November 10  
At Boston's Fenway Park, Dartmouth beat Brown 16–14, while at New York's Polo Grounds, Cornell beat Columbia 35–0.  Yale beat Maryland 16–14.  Notre Dame suffered its first loss, at Nebraska, 14–7.

Meanwhile, Illinois beat Wisconsin 10–0.  Michigan defeated the Quantico Marines football team 29–6.
In Los Angeles, California beat USC 13–7.  Washington beat Montana 26–14.  Kansas beat Washington University in St. Louis 83–0. Vanderbilt beat Tennessee 51–7.

November 17  
California (7–0–1) hosted Washington (8–0–0) and won 9–0.
Illinois beat Mississippi State 27–0, and Michigan won at Wisconsin 6–3, as both teams stayed unbeaten.  Notre Dame beat Butler 34–7.  Yale defeated Princeton 27–0.  Kansas beat Drake 17–0. Vanderbilt defeats Georgia 35–7.

November 24  
In Pittsburgh, Notre Dame defeated Carnegie Tech 26–0.  Dartmouth beat Colby College 62–0, and 
Cornell defeated Johns Hopkins 52–0.  Yale closed a perfect season with a 13–0 win over Harvard.
Illinois closed its season at 8–0–0 with a 9–0 win at Ohio State, while Michigan closed a perfect season with a 10–0 win over Minnesota.
California closed its season with a 9–0 win over Stanford.  Washington beat Washington State 24–7, and though it was second to Cal in the Pacific Coast Conference, received the invitation to the Rose Bowl to face (5–1–2) Navy.

On Thanksgiving Day, which was held on November 29 in 1923, Furman, which had won its first ten games, lost its final game to visiting Clemson, 7–6.  In Philadelphia, Cornell closed a perfect season with a 14–7 win over Pennsylvania.  Dartmouth finished with a 31–6 win over Columbia at New York.  Kansas and Missouri played to a 3–3 tie, giving the Jayhawks an unbeaten, if not untied (5–0–3) finish.  Notre Dame won at St. Louis 13–0. Vanderbilt beat Sewanee 7–0. Texas beat Texas A&M 6–0. Florida beat Alabama 16–6.

December 1 Washington beat Oregon 26–7.

Rose Bowl

A crowd of 48,000 turned out to watch Navy and Washington play an exciting game. Ira McKee's passing put Navy ahead 14–7 at halftime, after Washington's George Wilson had tied the game at 7–7. In the fourth quarter, Washington's Roy Petrie picked off a pass at Navy's 10 yard line, setting up the Huskies' tying touchdown for a 14 to 14 finish.  Later, it turned out that Washington halfback Les Sherman, whose two extra point attempts had tied the game, had played with a broken toe, while fullback Elmer Tesreau had played with a fractured leg.

Conference standings

Major conference standings

Independents

Minor conferences

Minor conference standings

Awards and honors

All-Americans

The consensus All-America team included:

Statistical leaders
 Player scoring most points: George Pfann, Cornell, 98

References